The Regional Council of Lombardy is the legislative assembly of Lombardy, Italy.

It was first elected in 1970, when the ordinary regions were instituted, on the basis of the Constitution of Italy of 1948.

Composition
The political system of the Regions of Italy was changed in 1995, when a semi-presidential system was introduced. If until that year the Council was elected under a pure proportional system and the President of Lombardy was chosen and dismissed by the Council, since 1995 the President and the Council are jointly elected by the people.

The Regional Council of Lombardy is composed of 80 members. From 1995 to 2012, 64 councillors were elected in provincial constituencies by proportional representation using the largest remainder method with a Droop quota and open lists, while 16 councillors (elected in bloc) came from a "regional list", including the President-elect. One seat was reserved for the candidate who came second. If a coalition won more than 40 seats with PR, as happened during the 2000 election, only 8 candidates from the regional list would be chosen and the number of those elected in provincial constituencies will be 72. If the winning coalition received less than 50% of votes, as happened during the 1995 election, special seats were added to the Council to ensure a large majority for the President's coalition.

A new Lombard electoral law was adopted on 26 October 2012. While the President of Lombardy and the leader of the opposition are still elected at-large, 78 councillors, instead of 64 as it was before, are elected by party lists under a form of semi-proportional representation. The winning coalition receives a jackpot of at least 45 seats, which are divided between all majority parties using the D'Hondt method, as it happens between the losing lists. Each party then distributes its seats to its provincial lists, where candidates are openly selected.

The Council is elected for a five-year term, but, if the President suffers a vote of no confidence, resigns or dies, under the simul stabunt, simul cadent clause introduced in 1999 (literally they will stand together or they will fall together), also the Council is dissolved and a snap election is called.

The Council chooses its speaker, called President of the Council (Presidente del Consiglio).

Political groups (2023–2028)
The Council is composed of the following political groups:

By coalition:

Historical composition

Presidents

This is a list of the Presidents of the Regional Council (Italian: Presidenti del Consiglio regionale):

Notes

See also
Regional council
Politics of Lombardy
President of Lombardy

References

External links
Regional Council of Lombardy

Politics of Lombardy
Regional
Lombardy